Tizi N'Test is a small town and rural commune in Taroudant Province of the Souss-Massa-Drâa region of Morocco. At the time of the 2004 census, the commune had a total population of 5391 people living in 906 households.

References 

Populated places in Taroudannt Province
Rural communes of Souss-Massa